The 1926 Centenary Gentlemen football team represented the Centenary College of Louisiana as a member of the Southern Intercollegiate Athletic Association (SIAA) during the 1926 college football season. The team was led by first-year head coach Homer Norton.

Schedule

References

Centenary
Centenary Gentlemen football seasons
Centenary Gentlemen football